Dun dun duuun! is a short three-chord musical phrase, or "sting", widely used in movies and television to indicate a moment of suspense. In modern productions it is often used as a joke effect or to invoke a nostalgic feeling. There are three main variations of the sting, all considered to be the same effect.

History

Its first proven use was in 1942 in CBS Radio's Suspense, where it was played at the end of the introduction of the first episode, The Burning Court. It is used to set the mood when the narrator recounts the protagonist looking through a book of famous poisoners through history, only to come across an image of his own wife. This version uses three descending chords. It is believed it was already in widespread use by this time, and may predate radio.

It is sometimes suggested it was originally introduced by Igor Stravinsky in The Rite of Spring, where a rapid three-note descending pattern is heard at the end of the section called "Glorification of the Chosen One" leading into "Evocation of the Ancestors". This was famously used as the music in the 1940 movie Fantasia where a tyrannosaurus and stegosaurus fight; the sting is played as the stegosaurus falls dead and sounds very similar to the version in Suspense. But this version is atypical, in most performances it does not have the distinct pattern found in Fantasia and generally does not sound like the sting.

Another famous example is heard in the movie Young Frankenstein, with the chord progression rising and then falling instead of all three chords falling. The Young Frankenstein version was made famous by the 2007 YouTube video Dramatic Chipmunk which has over 50 million views.

The most widely used modern variation is the "Shock Horror (A)" effect recorded in 1983 by composer Dick Walter as part of a series of four vinyl albums of sound snippets known as The Editor's Companion. This version is inverted from the Young Frankenstein pattern, using the notes E♭ - C - F♯, with the F♯ being especially discordant. Among its famous uses are Fresh Prince of Bel-Air, Ren and Stimpy and The IT Crowd. YouTube clips using this widely used version also have tens of millions of views.

Further listening
 "Oh My God" (Masta Artisan) - used as an Audio sample

References

Bibliography
  - the Fantasia version sounds very similar to Suspense
  - from Young Frankenstein
  - the earliest remaining recording, an all-descending variation
 
  - the "normal" playing of The Rite of Spring does not sound like the sting in Suspense
  - the Walter variation

Sound effects